Mandirituba is a municipality in the state of Paraná in the Southern Region of Brazil.

Total population (2010): 22,235 inhabitants, Portuguese, Polish, Ukrainian, Italian and German descendants

It is healthy country town of plantation by Curitiba district

See also
List of municipalities in Paraná

References

Municipalities in Paraná